James Chervak (born 7 April 1985) is an English cricketer. He played two first-class matches for Cambridge University Cricket Club between 2005 and 2006.

See also
 List of Cambridge University Cricket Club players

References

External links
 

1985 births
Living people
English cricketers
Cambridge University cricketers
Cricketers from Harrogate
English cricketers of the 21st century